Bando may refer to:

Practices 
Bando, a Burmese self-defense martial art
Bando (sport), a traditional Welsh sport and predecessor of Bandy
Bando yoga

Places 

Bandō, Ibaraki, a Japanese city
Byeonsan-bando National Park, South Korean national park
Bando, American-English slang for an abandoned house which is often used as a drug house

People 
Bandō, the family name of a number of actors' lineages in kabuki
 Bandō (disambiguation), a Japanese surname
Bando, a French-American graffiti artist
Chris Bando (born 1956), American baseball player
Sal Bando (born 1944), American baseball player
O Bando do Velho Jack, Brazilian music group

Other uses 
Bando, English slang for a short chamber .45 caliber Boxer-Henry Rifle used during the late 19th century

"Bando", a 2013 song by Migos from Y.R.N. (Young Rich Niggas)
Bando, a 2014 short film starring Migos, directed by Rik Cordero, based on the song
"Bando", a 2016 song by A Boogie wit da Hoodie and Don Q from Highbridge the Label: The Takeover Vol. 1